Dagmar Vaikalafi Dyck (born 1972) is a New Zealand artist of Tongan and German descent. Dyck's prints and paintings are often inspired by her cultural heritage and explore textile practices of Tonga. In 2012, Dyck was co-curator of No'o fakataha, a group exhibition of Tongan artists. Dyck's inspirations come from Tonga’s textiles arts, which includes bark cloth, mats, baskets and clothes.

Education
Dyck completed a Bachelor for Fine Arts through Elam School of Fine Arts in 1994 and a Post-Graduate Diploma of Fine Arts in 1995. She was the first women of Tongan descent to do so.  In 2009, Dyck graduated with a Graduate Diploma in teaching (Primary) from Victoria University of Wellington. She teaches art at Sylvia Park School in Mt Wellington, Auckland.

Awards and honors
In 2017 Dyck was selected for inclusion in an artist research role in the Ancient Futures Marsden Project to Europe in 2018.

In 2014 Dyck received the Contemporary Artist Award at the Creative New Zealand Arts Pasifika Awards.

In 2002 Dyck was a finalist for the Wallace Art Awards.

Selected exhibitions
 2017 un/trained thoughts, Warwick Henderson Gallery, Newmarket Auckland 
 2014 Tonga 'i Onopooni: Tonga Contemporary, Pataka Art + Museum, Porirua Wellington 
 2013. Pacific Voices II, Orexart Auckland.
 2013. To Be Pacific, Tairawhiti Museum + Art Gallery Gisborne.
 2013 Pacifica: Patterns of Exchange. Flagstaff Gallery Auckland with Sheyne Tuffery
 2013 Made in Oceania, Tapa Art + Landscapes, Rautenstrauch-Joest Museum, Cologne
 2013 Between the Lines, Solander Gallery Wellington,
 2012. Made in New Zealand: An exhibition of Fine Art from New Zealand. Agora Gallery, New York, USA.

References

External links
 Interview with Dyck

1972 births
Living people
New Zealand artists
New Zealand women artists
Tongan artists
University of Auckland alumni
New Zealand people of Tongan descent
New Zealand people of German descent
Tongan women curators
New Zealand women curators